Lake Tooma is a lake in Estonia.

See also
List of lakes of Estonia

Tooma
Landforms of Tallinn